Glimmerglass may refer to:

 Otsego Lake (New York), called "Glimmerglass" in the Leatherstocking Tales of James Fenimore Cooper
 Glimmerglass Festival, formerly Glimmerglass Opera
 Glimmerglass State Park, NY, US
 Glimmerglass Lagoon, State University of New York at Oswego, Oswego NY, US
 The Glimmer Glass, a tidal Inlet with a lift bridge, on Manasquan River, NJ
 Glimmerglass Systems, manufacturer of photonic switches used in the Amsterdam Internet Exchange
 Glimmerglass Vodka, a brand of vodka made by the Cooperstown Distillery.